Katarina Borg (born 21 March 1964) is a Swedish orienteering competitor. She has received two silver medals in the world championships, and finished overall third in the Orienteering World Cup two times.

World championships
She participated at the 1987 World Orienteering Championships, where she received a silver medal with the Swedish team (Arja Hannus, Marita Skogum and Karin Rabe). She received a silver medal in the classic distance at the 1997 World Championships.

World cup
Borg finished third overall at the 1990 Orienteering World Cup, behind Ragnhild Bente Andersen and Ragnhild Bratberg. She finished overall third also in 1998, behind Hanne Staff and Johanna Asklöf.

References

External links
 
 

1964 births
Living people
Swedish orienteers
Female orienteers
Foot orienteers
World Orienteering Championships medalists
20th-century Swedish women